Schitu is a commune located in Giurgiu County, Muntenia, Romania. It is composed of four villages: Bila, Cămineasca, Schitu and Vlașin.

References

Communes in Giurgiu County
Localities in Muntenia